Charles Castle (26 May 1939 – 5 October 2013) was a South African-born British tap dancer, writer and television producer.

Castle produced two documentaries, This Was Richard Tauber and This Was Noël Coward, which won the International Critics' Award at the Monte-Carlo Television Festival. He wrote biographies about celebrities, including Noël Coward, Joan Crawford, Oliver Messel, and Margaret, Duchess of Argyll.

Castle died at Montcabirol, a hamlet near Mirepoix, France.

References

External links
 

1939 births
2013 deaths
Tap dancers
British documentary filmmakers
British male dancers
British biographers
Celebrity biographers
South African emigrants to the United Kingdom